James Corsi (born June 19, 1954) is a Canadian-Italian former professional ice hockey goaltender and the current goaltending coach for the Columbus Blue Jackets. He was previously the goaltender coach of the St. Louis Blues and the Buffalo Sabres. Before beginning his hockey career, Corsi also played soccer at the professional level as a forward in the North American Soccer League for the Montreal Olympique. The following season he played in the National Soccer League with the Quebec Selects.

Playing career
Corsi played in the World Hockey Association for the Quebec Nordiques and the National Hockey League for the Edmonton Oilers. He has dual Italian and Canadian citizenship. He became the goaltender of the nazionale (Italian national ice hockey team) and spent the majority of his career with Varese. He also played for HC Gherdëina, SG Cortina and HC Bolzano during his time in Italy's Serie A league. Corsi played on the Italian team at the 1982 World Championship that stunned a Team Canada that had Wayne Gretzky on it by tying Canada 3-3 and went on to beat the US at the same tournament relegating them to the B-Pool for 1983.

Post-playing career
Corsi is also known as being the namesake for the development of the Corsi rating. This indicator is essentially a plus-minus statistic that measures shot attempts (usually only counting those at even strength). A player receives a plus for any shot attempt (on net, missed, or blocked) that his team directs at 
the opponent's net, and a minus for any shot attempt against his own net. This indicator is widely used in most NHL teams as it has shown a strong correlation to player and team success. The person credited with popularizing the statistic, Vic Ferrari, attributed the stat to then-Sabres general manager Darcy Regier, but named it after Corsi because he thought Corsi's name had a better ring to it (he was inadvertently correct since Corsi did create the statistic). Corsi himself has stated he is flattered to be associated with the statistic.

He was relieved of his duties with the St. Louis Blues on February 1, 2017.

Teams
Soccer
Montreal Olympique 1971, 1973 
Quebec Selects 1974

Hockey
Maine Nordiques 1976–77
Quebec Nordiques 1977–78
Binghamton Dusters 1978–79
Quebec Nordiques 1978–79
Houston Apollos 1979–80
Oklahoma City Stars 1979–80
Edmonton Oilers 1979–80
HC Gardena Finstral Ortisei 1980–1982
SG Cortina 1982–1983
HC Bolzano Würth 1983–1984
Varese HC 1987–92

Coaching
Goaltending coach: Buffalo Sabres 2001–2014
Goaltending Coach: St. Louis Blues 2014–2017

Career statistics

Regular season and playoffs

International

References

External links
 
 

1954 births
Living people
Association football forwards
Binghamton Dusters players
Bolzano HC players
Buffalo Sabres coaches
Canadian sportspeople of Italian descent
Canadian soccer players
Columbus Blue Jackets coaches
Edmonton Oilers players
HC Gardena players
HC Varese players
Ice hockey people from Montreal
Italian ice hockey goaltenders
Houston Apollos players
Maine Nordiques players
Montreal Olympique players
North American Soccer League (1968–1984) players
Oklahoma City Stars players
Quebec Nordiques (WHA) players
St. Louis Blues coaches
SG Cortina players
Soccer players from Montreal
Undrafted National Hockey League players
Canadian National Soccer League players
Canadian ice hockey goaltenders
Canadian expatriate ice hockey players in the United States
Citizens of Italy through descent
Canadian ice hockey coaches
Italian ice hockey coaches
Canadian expatriate sportspeople in Germany
Italian expatriate sportspeople in Germany